Fortune TV is a Burmese digital Free-to-Air TV channel that run under MRTV's Multiplex Playout System based in Yangon, Myanmar. Fortune TV is operated by Fortune Group. They have signed a cooperation agreement with state-run Myanmar Radio and Television (MRTV) to operate as content providers for digital free-to-air TV channels in a multi-playout system of MRTV on 17 February 2018. The trial was broadcast on 12 February 2019 and 4 days later on 16 February, they launched the channel officially. They broadcast entertainment as well as information and knowledge program from 6 a.m. to 12 midnight. Fortune are also providing quality infotainment content on the FTA and OTT platforms.

Programming

Current Program
The Show

Television series

Local
 Ah Saung (2019) 
 Ah Saung: Season 2 (2020) 
 The Rose (2022)

International
 Huwag Kang Mangamba (Burmese: Sann Kyae Thaww Kan Kyamar) (2021)
 La Vida Lena (Burmese: Maya Galeisar) (2022)

References

External links

Television channels in Myanmar
Television channels and stations established in 2019
2019 establishments in Myanmar